Nedkov is a Bulgarian masculine surname, its feminine counterpart is Nedkova. It may refer to

 Iliyan Nedkov (born 1958), Bulgarian judoka
 Stanislav Nedkov (born 1981), Bulgarian mixed martial arts fighter
 Stoycho Nedkov (born 1986), Bulgarian footballer

Bulgarian-language surnames